Don Allen "Donnie" Robinson (born June 8, 1957) is a former Major League Baseball pitcher who played for the Pittsburgh Pirates, San Francisco Giants, California Angels, and Philadelphia Phillies, from 1978 through 1992. Nicknamed "The Caveman", Robinson's career record was 109–106 with a 3.79 ERA.

In 1978, as a 21-year-old rookie, Robinson was 14–6  with a 3.47 ERA. His won-loss percentage was second to NL Cy Young Award winner Gaylord Perry. Robinson was named The Sporting News NL Rookie Pitcher of the Year and was third in overall NL Rookie of the Year. He finished eighth in the Cy Young Award contest.

The next year, he went 8–8 with a 3.87 ERA. He also pitched in six postseason games, winning two and helping the Pirates to the 1979 World Series championship.

Robinson was regarded as one of the best-hitting pitchers during his time, winning three Silver Slugger Awards in 1982, 1989, and 1990. In 1990, Robinson became the first pitcher to hit a pinch-hit home run since 1971 against the San Diego Padres. He hit 13 home runs in his career. He compiled a .231 batting average (146-631) with 47 runs and 69 RBI.

Robinson was the recipient of the Hutch Award in 1984. On April 18, 1987, he gave up Mike Schmidt's 500th career home run. In 1990, pitching for the Giants, he lost the first ever no-hitter at Veteran's Stadium to the Phillies' Terry Mulholland, 6–0.

He made the World Series again in 1989, winning Game 3 of the NLCS against the Chicago Cubs to help the Giants get there. Robinson enjoyed a renaissance with the Giants: from 1987 to 1991, he was 42–33 with a 3.56 ERA, and started a majority of his 170 games with them.

Robinson's parents, Donald and Priscilla Robinson, reside in the city of Kenova, West Virginia, where Robinson served on the city council. Currently, Don Robinson is the pitching coach for the State College of Florida baseball team in Bradenton, Florida.

References

External links

1957 births
Baseball players from Kentucky
Baseball players from West Virginia
California Angels players
Charleston Patriots players
Columbus Clippers players
Gulf Coast Pirates players
Living people
Lynn Pirates (1983) players
Major League Baseball pitchers
Sportspeople from Ashland, Kentucky
People from Kenova, West Virginia
Philadelphia Phillies players
Pittsburgh Pirates players
Prince William Pirates players
San Francisco Giants players
San Jose Giants players
West Virginia city council members
Silver Slugger Award winners